Arne Öhman (31 May 1943 – 19 March 2020) was a Swedish psychologist who served as professor of psychology at the Karolinska Institutet from 1993 to 2010, where he was the head of the Department of Clinical Neuroscience from 2001 to 2004. He previously served as a professor of clinical psychology at the University of Uppsala from 1982 to 1993. He was noted for his research in the fields of experimental psychology and psychophysiology, and on the psychology of emotion. He was president of the Society for Psychophysiological Research from 1984 to 1985, and received its award for Distinguished Contribution to Psychophysiology in 2001. He was a fellow of the Center for Advanced Study in the Behavioral Sciences from 2005 to 2006. He was named a member of the Academia Europaea in 1992 and the Royal Swedish Academy of Sciences in 1998. He was an elected member of the Nobel Assembly at the Karolinska Institute from 1997 to 2010, as well as a fellow of the Association for Psychological Science.

References

Further reading

External links

1943 births
2020 deaths
Swedish psychologists
People from Ljusdal Municipality
Experimental psychologists
Center for Advanced Study in the Behavioral Sciences fellows
Fellows of the Association for Psychological Science
Members of Academia Europaea
Members of the Royal Swedish Academy of Sciences
Uppsala University alumni
Academic staff of Uppsala University
Academic staff of the Karolinska Institute